Jankoji Rao Shinde was the third Maharaja of Gwalior State. He became Maharaja of Gwalior after death of his father, 
Jayappaji Rao Scindia.

Biography
He was younger son of Sardar Jayappaji Rao Shinde, and acceded to the position on the death of his father on 25 July 1755. As he was only 10 years of age at that time, a regency was established, led by his uncle Dattaji Rao Shinde, Jayappa Rao's brother, until 10 January 1760.

Third Battle of Panipat
He fought against the Afghans at the Third battle of Panipat on 14 January 1761. Jankoji with around 7,000 troops was positioned to the right of Shamsher Bahadur and was opposed to Najib Khan Rohilla. When the news spread around that Vishwas Rao has been shot dead,  Jankoji and his uncle Tukoji on seeing the thinning crowd at the Maratha centre rushed to help Sadashiv Rao Bhau. Jankoji fought the Afghans who had penetrated into Maratha centre.

Jankoji was taken prisoner by Barkhurdar Khan secretly. Kashiraj met Jankoji secretly in a tent of Barkhurdar Khan, he was wounded with a ball and with a spear in the arm. Kashiraj was told by Moti Lal, the Diwan of Barkhurdar Khan  that Jankoji would be released if a ransom of seven lakhs would be paid. Unfortunately these dealings became known to Najib Khan who instigated Wazir Shah Wali to take this matter up to Ahmad Shah Abdali. Abdali then ordered his nasaqchis to search for Jankoji, Barkhurdar fearing harmful consequences ordered his men to murder Jankoji and bury him privately. Later on few imposters of Jankoji claimed themselves as the Shinde chief but their all claims were proven wrong by the Scindia survivors.

Succession 
After the death of Jankoji, the Scindia clan remained without any leader for two years. Finally in 1763 Kadarji Rao Scindia was appointed as new leader of clan.

In popular culture
 In the 1994 Hindi TV series The Great Maratha, Jankoji's character was portrayed by Deepraj Rana.
 In the 2019 Hindi film Panipat, Jankoji's Character was played by Gashmeer Mahajani.

References

External links

1745 births
1761 deaths
Jankoji Rao